Abdus Salam Murshedy is a Bangladeshi politician, entrepreneur and former national team football player. Aligned with the Bangladesh Awami League, he is elected uncontested as member of the Jatiya Sangsad for Khulna-4 since September 2018. He is the managing director of Envoy Group, senior vice president of Bangladesh Football Federation (BFF), President of Exporters Association of Bangladesh (EAB) and former president of Bangladesh Garment Manufacturers and Exporters' Association (BGMEA). He is the candidate nominated by the Awami League nominated by the Khulna-4 constituency by-election. He has been elected as a  Commercially Important Person (CIP) by the Government of Bangladesh in 2014.

Biography

Early life and education
Murshedy was born in Rupsa Upazila, Khulna district. His father Mohammad Israel and mother Rizia Khatun.

Salam came from a Khulna family with a very strong connection with sports. His eldest brother Jamal Haider represented East Pakistan in Volleyball before 1971. Abul Kalam Azad, the 3rd brother was for a long time the body building champion of Bangladesh in the late 1970s and early 1980s.

Domestic football
Salam was a highly successful center forward in football. In the '70s, he started his journey with football by playing for Young Boys Club of Khulna. He came to Dhaka from Khulna in the late seventies. At that time, he started playing in Dhaka League for Azad Sporting Club. In 1979 he played for BJMC and helped them win the league title.

He joined the Mohammedan Sporting Club, Dhaka in 1980. With them he won league titles in 1980 and 1982 and 4 successive Federation Cup title starting from 1980. In 1981 he scored 4 goals in the Super League match against Wari Club. Skipper Badal Roy scored the other two goals as MSC won 6–0.

1982 saw Salam reach the pick of his career. He contributed to MSC's first title win in foreign soil, scoring 10 goals during the Ashish Jabbar football tournament in Durgapur, India. Then in the Dhaka League he created a new record scoring 27 goals in a season. The record still exists. Throughout the season he had a wonderful understanding with No.10 Badal Roy.

In 1982, with goals in the Dhaka League, Federation Cup and in India, Salam scored 40 goals throughout the year. During his seven years at MSC, Salam scored a total of 74 league goals.

But he suffered a bad hand injury in 1983, and although he returned to football within a few months, he was never the same player again.

International football
In December 1980, Salam played for the Bangladesh U-19 team in Dacca. He partnered Aslam of BJMC in the forward line. Bangladesh finished runners up behind Qatar and thus qualified for the main event.

In early 1981, the youth team, now called the Bangladesh (Red) team reached the finals of the first Preseident's Cup in Dacca. But they lost the final to a South Korean team. During the 1982 Quaid-e-Azam International Tournament, Salam scored for Bangladesh against Pakistan Youth team in an embarrassing 1–2 loss.
Salam suffered a serious hand injury while playing against Malaysia for the Bangladesh (Green) team in 1983, and this badly affected his prospects in international football.

Business
Murshedy is the managing director of Envoy Group. Besides, he is the director of Premier Bank. He started Envoy Garment's journey in 1984. Later he made 15 more ready-made garment companies. He is currently the president of Bangladesh Exporters Association (EAB), senior vice president of Bangladesh Football Federation (BFF), member of the board of directors of Bangladesh University of Fashion and Technology (BUFT). Earlier, he was appointed as the president of Bangladesh Garment Manufacturers and Exporters Association (BGMEA) and director of Bangladesh Mohammedan Sporting Club.

Personal life 
Murshedy is married to Sharmin Salam. They have two sons and one daughter.

Awards 
 National Sports Awards, 2013
 Kar Bahadur Paribar, 2017

References

Living people
People from Khulna District
Bangladeshi businesspeople
Awami League politicians
10th Jatiya Sangsad members
11th Jatiya Sangsad members
Recipients of the Bangladesh National Sports Award
Bangladeshi footballers
Bangladesh international footballers
Bangladesh youth international footballers
1980 AFC Asian Cup players
Asian Games competitors for Bangladesh
Footballers at the 1982 Asian Games
Mohammedan SC (Dhaka) players
Team BJMC players
1963 births
Association football forwards